A.K.M. Shahidul Islam is a Jatiya Party (Ershad) politician and the former Member of Parliament of Kurigram-1.  He was also a member of the UNESCO World Heritage Center's 21st Session of the General Assembly of States' Parties, representing Bangladesh, in 2017.  He was also at the time the Research and Liaison Officer for the Bangladeshi Embassy in Paris, France.

Career
Islam was elected to parliament from Kurigram-1 as a Jatiya Party candidate in 1986 and 1988.

References

Jatiya Party politicians
Living people
3rd Jatiya Sangsad members
4th Jatiya Sangsad members
Year of birth missing (living people)